Time Team is a British television programme that originally aired on Channel 4 from 16 January 1994 to 7 September 2014. It returned online in 2022 for two episodes released on YouTube. Created by television producer Tim Taylor and presented by actor Tony Robinson, each episode featured a team of specialists carrying out an archaeological dig over a period of three days, with Robinson explaining the process in lay terms. The specialists changed throughout the programme's run, although it consistently included professional archaeologists such as Mick Aston, Carenza Lewis, Francis Pryor and Phil Harding. The sites excavated ranged in date from the Palaeolithic to the Second World War.

In October 2012, Channel 4 announced that the final series would be broadcast in 2013. Series 20 was screened from January–March 2013 and nine specials were screened between May 2013 and September 2014. In May 2021, Taylor announced the return of the series, with free episodes to be shown on YouTube.

Format

At the start of the programme, Tony Robinson explains, in an opening "piece to camera", the reasons for the team's visit to the site and during the dig, he enthusiastically encourages the archaeologists to explain their decisions, discoveries and conclusions. He tries to ensure that everything is comprehensible to the archaeologically uninitiated. The site is frequently suggested by a member of the viewing public. Time Team uncover as much as they can of the archaeology and history of the site in three days.

Excavations are not just carried out to entertain viewers. Robinson claims that the archaeologists involved with Time Team have published more scientific papers on excavations carried out in the programme than all British university archaeology departments over the same period and that by 2013, the programme had become the biggest funder of field archaeology in the country.

Team members
A team of archaeologists, usually led by Mick Aston or Francis Pryor (the latter usually heading Bronze Age and Iron Age digs), including field archaeologist Phil Harding, congregate at a site, usually in Britain. The original Time Team line-up from 1994 has changed over the years. Historian and archivist Robin Bush was a regular in the first nine series, having been involved with the programme through his long friendship with Aston. Architectural historian Beric Morley featured in ten episodes between 1995 and 2002. In 2005, Carenza Lewis left to pursue other interests. She was replaced by Helen Geake, Anglo-Saxon specialist. The regular team also included: Stewart Ainsworth, landscape investigator; John Gater and Chris Gaffney, archaeological geophysicists; Henry Chapman, surveyor; and Victor Ambrus, illustrator.

The team was supplemented by experts appropriate for the period and type of site. Guy de la Bédoyère has often been present for Roman digs, as well as those involving the Second World War such as D-Day and aircraft (such as the Spitfire). Architectural historian Jonathan Foyle has appeared in episodes relating to excavations of country estates. Paul Blinkhorn (pottery), Mark Corney (coins), Carl Thorpe (pottery), and Jackie McKinley (bones) have appeared from time to time. Mick ‘the dig’ Worthington, an excavator in the early series, occasionally returned as a dendrochronologist, whereupon he was dubbed 'Mick the twig'. Osteoarcheologist Margaret Cox often assisted with forensic archaeology, mainly between 1998–2005. Other specialists who appeared from time to time include historian Bettany Hughes, archaeologist Gustav Milne, East of England specialist Ben Robinson, and David S. Neal, expert on Roman mosaics. Local historians also joined in when appropriate.

In February 2012, it was announced that Aston had left the show due to format changes. The disputed changes included hiring anthropologist Mary-Ann Ochota as a co-presenter, dispensing with other archaeologists and what he thought were plans to "cut down the informative stuff about the archaeology". "The time had come to leave. I never made any money out of it, but a lot of my soul went into it. I feel really, really angry about it," he told British Archaeology magazine. Time Team producer Tim Taylor released a statement in response to the news reports saying "His concerns are of great importance to me. We have addressed some of them" and that "you’ve not heard the last of Mick on Time Team".

Regular team members in later years included archaeologist Neil Holbrook, Roman coins specialist Philippa Walton, and historian Sam Newton. Younger members of Time Team who made regular appearances include: Jenni Butterworth, Raksha Dave, Kerry Ely, Brigid Gallagher, Rob Hedge, Katie Hirst, Alex Langlands, Cassie Newland, Ian Powlesland, Alice Roberts, Faye Simpson, Barney Sloane, Tracey Smith, and Matt Williams.

Production
Time Team developed from an earlier Channel 4 programme, Time Signs, first broadcast in 1991. Produced by Taylor, Time Signs had featured Aston and Harding, who went on to appear on Time Team. Following that show's cancellation, Taylor went on to develop a more attractive format, producing the idea for Time Team, which Channel 4 also picked up, broadcasting the first series in 1994. Time Team has had many companion shows during its run, including Time Team Extra (1998), History Hunters (1998–1999) and Time Team Digs (2002),
whilst several spin-off books have been published. The programme features special episodes, often documentaries on history or archaeology and live episodes. The programme has been exported to 35 other countries.
Time Team America, a US version of the programme, was broadcast on PBS in 2009.

On 13 September 2007, during the filming of a jousting reenactment for a special episode of Time Team, a splinter from a balsa wood lance went through the eye-slit in the helmet of one of the participants and entered his eye socket. 54 year-old Paul Anthony Allen, a member of a re-enactment society, died a week later in hospital. Channel 4 stated that the programme would be shown, but without the re-enactment sequence. The episode, dedicated to Allen, was transmitted on 25 February 2008.

Cancellation 
In 2012, Aston announced he was leaving the show after criticising format changes that focused less on archaeological activities. Channel 4 subsequently announced that the final Time Team series would be broadcast in 2013. Viewing figures had been in decline from 2.5 million in 2008 to 1.5 million in November 2011. The regular Time Team programme ended on 24 March 2013. Aston died unexpectedly on 24 June 2013.

In October 2013, Robinson said in an interview with Radio Times that he believed Time Team still had life in it and suggested that after a three- or four-year absence it could make a return. He also expressed support for a fan-organised Facebook campaign to bring the Time Team crew together again to carry out a dig in memory of Aston. The final Time Team special aired on 7 September 2014.

Revival 
In December 2020, producer Tim Taylor announced that Time Team would begin airing episodes on a YouTube channel called "Time Team Classics". Taylor also announced the launch of the Time Team Patreon page, allowing fans to financially support efforts to revive the series. On 29 January 2021, the project exceeded its goal of 3,000 patrons.

On 17 May 2021, Taylor made an announcement on the return of the series, with episodes planned to air for free on the YouTube channel. Confirmed team members included Carenza Lewis, John Gater, Helen Geake, Stewart Ainsworth, Raysan Al-Kubaisi, Neil Emmanuel, Naomi Sewpaul, Matt Williams, Henry Chapman, Dani Wootton, Brigid Gallagher, Neil Holbrook, Suzannah Lipscomb, Jimmy Adcock, Natalie Haynes, Derek Pitman, Lawrence Shaw, Pete Spencer, and several returning production team members.

In September 2021, it was announced that Gus Casely-Hayford and Natalie Haynes would present the revived series.

Series 21 featured two three-part episodes, each covering a new dig conducted in 2021. The first of these episodes, which premiered between 18 and 20 March 2022, covered the excavation of an Iron Age settlement on the Lizard Peninsula in Cornwall. The second episode premiered between 8 and 10 April 2022 and featured the excavation of a Roman villa in the grounds of Broughton Castle in Oxfordshire, discovered by metal detectorist and amateur archaeologist Keith Westcott in 2016.

Music
The series' original theme music was composed by Paul Greedus.

The majority of the incidental tracks and main themes for many of the specials (Dinosaur Hunting in Montana, D-Day, The Big Dig etc) were composed by Steve Day.

Other formats
Time Team's Big Dig was an expansion on the live format. A weekend of live broadcasts in June 2003 was preceded by a week of daily short programmes. It involved about a thousand members of the public in excavating test pits each one metre square by fifty centimetres deep. Most of these pits were in private gardens and the project stirred up controversies about approaches to public archaeology.

Time Team's Big Roman Dig (2005) saw this format altered, in an attempt to avoid previous controversies, through the coverage of nine archaeological sites around the UK which were already under investigation by professional archaeologists. Time Team covered the action through live link-ups based at a Roman Villa at Dinnington in Somerset – itself a Time Team excavation from 2003. Over 60 other professionally supervised excavations were supported by Time Team and carried out around the country in association with the programme. A further hundred activities relating to Roman history were carried out by schools and other institutions around the UK.

Time Team Specials are documentary programmes about topics in history and archaeology made by the same production company. They are generally presented by Robinson and often feature one or more of the familiar faces from the regular programme of Time Team. In some cases the programme makers have followed the process of discovery at a large commercial or research excavation by another body, such as that to commemorate the 90th anniversary of the ending of the First World War at the Vampire dugout in Belgium. Time Team usually does not carry out excavations for these programmes, but may contribute a reconstruction.

Time Team History of Britain saw Robinson and the team document everything they have learned up to now and show a history of Britain. Behind the Scenes of Time Team showed meetings of the archaeologists, and material not transmitted during the episode of the dig. 10 Years of Time Team presented a round-up of what has happened in Time Team over the past 10 years and what they expect to happen in the future.

The Time Team website (editor Steve Platt) won a BAFTA for interactive entertainment (factual) in 2002.

Influence
Time Team has been credited with promoting archaeology in the UK. In a 2008 report produced by English Heritage, a working group of Palaeolithic specialists recognised the importance of the show in "promoting public awareness" of Palaeolithic Britain, something which they argued was to be encouraged.

DVD releases
Complete series have been released in Australia starting with Series 15 in 2010.
Since then, Series 12 (2014),
Series 14 (2012),
Series 16 (2010),
Series 17 (2011),
Series 18 (2012),
Series 19 (2012)
and Series 20 (2013) have all been released in Australia. 'Best Of' DVDs were released in the UK over the years; however, a complete series had never been released until Series 18 was released by Acorn Media UK on 6 February 2012. On 15 May 2012, Acorn Media released a collection of Roman-themed episodes on Region One DVD.

See also
 Time Team America – the American version of the show

Footnotes

References

Bibliography
 
 Current Archaeology magazine

External links
 
 
  — contains latest news from digs
 
 
"Time Team geophysics: from pits to palaces" – The Past, 1 February 2011

 
1994 British television series debuts
2014 British television series endings
2000s British television series
Archaeology of the United Kingdom
Channel 4 original programming
English-language television shows
Experimental archaeology